Moita Rugby Clube da Bairrada is a rugby team based in Anadia, Portugal. As of the 2012/13 season, they play in the Second Division of the Campeonato Nacional de Rugby.

External links
Moita Rugby Clube da Bairrada

Portuguese rugby union teams
Rugby clubs established in 1984
Sport in Anadia, Portugal